Samo, also known as Daba, Nomad, and Supei, is a Trans–New Guinea language of New Guinea, spoken in the plains east of the Strickland River in Western Province of Papua New Guinea. It has switch-reference marking for the subject of a clause.

References

Languages of Western Province (Papua New Guinea)
East Strickland languages